Tyrannoneustes is an extinct genus of geosaurine metriorhynchid crocodyliform from the Callovian stage Oxford Clay Formation of England and the Marnes de Dives of France. It contains a single species, Tyrannoneustes lythrodectikos, meaning "blood-biting tyrant swimmer".

History and description 

The genus was rediscovered after a century of storage in a museum basement after being unearthed by fossil hunter Alfred Nicholson Leeds between the years of 1907 and 1909. Its lower jaw measured about 26 inches long and its teeth were blade-like, likely built to attack prey as large or larger than itself, similar to the Late Jurassic Dakosaurus, Torvoneustes, and Plesiosuchus.

References 

Prehistoric pseudosuchian genera
Prehistoric marine crocodylomorphs
Callovian life
Middle Jurassic crocodylomorphs
Middle Jurassic reptiles of Europe
Jurassic England
Fossils of England
Oxford Clay
Jurassic France
Fossils of France
Fossil taxa described in 2013